The 1959–60 FIBA European Champions Cup was third season of the European top-tier level professional basketball club competition FIBA European Champions Cup (now called EuroLeague). It was won by Rīgas ASK for the third straight time, an accomplishment only achieved again by Jugoplastika in the late 1980s, in 1989–1991. In the EuroLeague Finals, Riga defeated the Soviet Union League club, Dinamo Tbilisi, in both final games (51–61 & 62–69). Riga defeated Slovan Orbis Prague in the semifinals, and AŠK Olimpija in the quarterfinals.

Competition system
21 teams. European national domestic league champions, plus the then current FIBA European Champions Cup title holders only, playing in a tournament system. The Finals were a two-game home and away aggregate.

First round

|}

*Originally, the Champion of the Italian League was drawn to play against the Austrian champion, but the former was Simmenthal Milano, who was banned in European competition. Since the Italian Federation refused to name another entrant in Champions Cup, Union Babenberg received a forfeit (2-0) in both games.

**Maccabi Tel Aviv withdrew before the competition due to internal problems and Fenerbahçe received a forfeit (2-0) in both games.

Second round

|}

Automatically qualified to the quarter finals
 Rīgas ASK (title holder)

Quarterfinals

|}

Semifinals

|}

Finals

|}

1st leg: Vere Park, Tbilisi, 10 May 1960

Vere Park during that Final 

2nd leg: Daugava Stadion, Rīga, 15 May 1960;Attendance:17,000

Awards

FIBA European Champions Cup Finals Top Scorer
 Jānis Krūmiņš ( Rīgas ASK)

References

External links
 1959–60 FIBA European Champions Cup
 1959–60 FIBA European Champions Cup
 Champions Cup 1959–60 Line-ups and Stats

FIBA
EuroLeague seasons